The Augustinian Sisters, Servants of Jesus and Mary was founded in Frosinone in 1827 by Maria Teresa Spinelli. They follow the Rule of St. Augustine.

External links
Augustinian Sisters, Servants of Jesus and Mary
Irmãs Agostinianas Servas de Jesus e Maria
Life of Teresa Spinelli (Augustinians of the Midwest)

Catholic female orders and societies
Religious organizations established in 1827
Catholic religious institutes established in the 19th century
1827 establishments in Italy